John A. Kull (born John A. Kolonauski: June 24, 1882 – March 30, 1936) was a Major League Baseball pitcher. In his one and only career game, he had a 1-0 record, going three innings, and striking out four batters. This give him a career winning percentage of 1.000. He also handed his one fielding chance (an assist) flawlessly, giving him a lifetime fielding percentage of 1.000. He batted and threw left-handed, and singled in his only turn at-bat driving in two runs for an MLB career batting average of 1.000.  

Kull was born in Shenandoah, Pennsylvania and died in Schuylkill Haven, Pennsylvania.

References

External links

1882 births
1936 deaths
Philadelphia Athletics players
Major League Baseball pitchers
Baseball players from Pennsylvania
Fayetteville Highlanders players
Youngstown Steelmen players
Anderson Electricians players
Danbury Hatters players
Newport News Shipbuilders players
Paterson Silk Citys players
People from Shenandoah, Pennsylvania